Are We Done Yet? is a 2007 American family comedy film directed by Steve Carr and starring Ice Cube. The film is a remake of the 1948 Cary Grant comedy film Mr. Blandings Builds His Dream House, previously remade as the 1986 Tom Hanks comedy film The Money Pit, and a sequel to the 2005 film Are We There Yet? The screenplay is by Hank Nelken. It was produced by Revolution Studios and RKO Pictures and distributed by Columbia Pictures.

The film was shot on location in Tsawwassen, British Columbia, Canada, but is set in Newberg, Oregon, United States.

Plot
Two years after the events of the first film, Nick Persons has married Suzanne and moved her children, Kevin and Lindsey into his apartment, as well as purchasing a 2007 Cadillac Escalade after he accidentally burnt up his Lincoln Navigator SUV. He has also sold his sports memorabilia store to his friend, Marty.

The family has also bought a Berger Picard pet dog and named it Coco. Kevin and Lindsey have both matured since the previous events. While getting ready for an interview with Magic Johnson to launch a sports magazine, Suzanne tells Nick that she is pregnant and they later find out that they will be having twins. Needing more space, Suzanne and Nick go check out a house in the suburbs.

They meet Chuck Mitchell Jr., a local real estate agent/contractor, and after some talking, Nick decides to buy the house. The family then packs up their things and moves into the house, with Lindsey and Kevin (mostly the former) being against the move. However, as it turns out, Nick failed to get the house inspected first, and they soon find a mold infestation. While trying to resolve the mold issue, Chuck discovers even more problems with the house, and Nick becomes angry with him as he almost destroys it trying to fix them all.

Meanwhile, Lindsey sneaks out to go to a party with Chuck’s teenage employees, and when Nick finds out, he grounds her. Nick finally decides to fire Chuck, which causes all those working on the house to quit out of loyalty to Chuck, and Suzanne to take the kids and move into the guest house. After taking some time to think, Nick decides to fix the house on his own and also to apologize to Chuck, especially when he was told that his wife, a famous country singer, died a few years ago. Chuck responds by bringing his friends back to help.

When Suzanne goes into labor, with the hospital half-an-hour away, Nick, Kevin, and Lindsey have to deliver the babies. Chuck tries to get there, but his truck breaks down and he is forced to power walk down to the house. While she's still in labor, Nick gets a call from Magic Johnson. After Suzanne gives birth to identical twin boys, the movie ends six months later with a big BBQ in their backyard, at which Nick debuts his new magazine titled Are We Done Yet?, based on his experience building the house.

Cast
 Ice Cube as Nick Persons
 Nia Long as Suzanne Persons
 John C. McGinley as Chuck Mitchell Jr.
 Aleisha Allen as Lindsey Persons
 Philip Daniel Bolden as Kevin Persons
 Tahj Mowry as Danny Pulu
 Dan Joffre as Billy Pulu
 Pedro Miguel Arce as Georgie Pulu
 Linda Kash as Mrs. Rooney
 Hayes MacArthur as Jimmy, The Bartender
 Jacob Vargas as Mike, The Plumber
 Colin and Gavin Strange as The Persons' Twins
 Jonathan Katz as Mr. Rooney
 Earvin "Magic" Johnson as himself

Production
The film is a remake of the 1948 Cary Grant comedy Mr. Blandings Builds His Dream House and produced by Ted Hartley of RKO Pictures.

Release
The film made $58.4 million worldwide. The film was released in the United Kingdom on June 8, 2007, and opened on #3, behind Oceans Thirteen and Pirates of the Caribbean: At World's End.

Reception
Like its predecessor, Are We Done Yet? was panned by critics. On Rotten Tomatoes, the film has an approval rating of 8% based on 92 reviews, and has an average rating of 2.81/10. The site's consensus reads: "Are We Done Yet? plays it way too safe with generic slapstick and uninspired domestic foibles."
On Metacritic, the film has a higher score than its predecessor's, at 36 out of 100, based on 21 reviews, meaning "generally unfavorable reviews." Audiences polled by CinemaScore gave the film an average grade of "B" on an A+ to F scale.

Neil Smith for BBC.com gave the film 1 out of 5 stars and wrote: "McGinley, as it happens, is the film's only trump card, his madcap multi tasker stealing every scene he's in and leaving the movie's nominal star for dead."
In one of the few positive reviews, Nathan Rabin of The A.V. Club gave the film a grade B, and praises McGinley and calls Ice Cube's performance "strangely charming". Rabin concludes: "It isn't gangsta, but it's winning all the same."

References

External links

 
 
 

2007 films
2007 comedy films
2000s pregnancy films
Remakes of American films
American sequel films
2000s English-language films
Films based on multiple works
Films about families
Films set in Oregon
Magic Johnson
American pregnancy films
Cube Vision films
Revolution Studios films
RKO Pictures films
Films directed by Steve Carr
Films produced by Ice Cube
Films scored by Teddy Castellucci
African-American comedy films
Columbia Pictures films
Films shot in British Columbia
2000s American films
African-American films